Miroslav Jambor (born 8 March 1979) is a Slovakian para table tennis player who plays in sports category 7. He has haemophilia which causes him to have knee problems when standing. He is currently ranked world number 20 in his sports category.

References

External links 
 

1979 births
Living people
Paralympic table tennis players of Slovakia
Table tennis players at the 2008 Summer Paralympics
Table tennis players at the 2012 Summer Paralympics
Table tennis players at the 2016 Summer Paralympics
Medalists at the 2008 Summer Paralympics
Paralympic medalists in table tennis
Paralympic silver medalists for Slovakia
Paralympic bronze medalists for Slovakia
Sportspeople from Poprad
Slovak male table tennis players